The Nampo-class corvettes (or light frigates) are a class of warships built in North Korea. They were seen from satellite-photos in 2013 and are believed to be a replacement for the older . The class has some similarities to Myanmar Navy UMS Tabinshweht, an Anawrahta-class frigate.

Two known hulls have been launched: one on the Japan Sea in Najin and one in Nampo for service in the Yellow Sea.

Specification

Little is known of their features and weapons.
One of the clear element is the presence of a helicopter-deck and possibly even a small hangar on the hull.

The only weapon system identified is anti-submarine rockets (RBU 1200 A/S mortars), thus making the corvette a response for the recent developments of the South Korean Navy in the field of submarines.

Further weapons could be added however, including guns and anti-ship missiles (such as the Kh-35, known to have been recently put in service in the KPN). The potential missile systems appears to be SAM and SSM.

By western standard, the ships should be considered corvettes, however they're also described as light frigates for their role.

References

Corvettes of the Korean People's Navy
Corvette classes